Conor Keys (born 9 July 1996) is a Canadian rugby union player who generally plays as a lock represents Canada internationally. He currently plays for New England Free Jacks of Major League Rugby (MLR) in the United States.

He was included in the Canadian squad for the 2019 Rugby World Cup which is held in Japan for the first time and also marks his first World Cup appearance.

Career 
He made his international debut for Canada against Chile on 11 February 2017. He made his first World Cup match appearance against Italy on 26 September 2019 in Canada's opening match of the tournament in Pool B. The match ended up in a losing cause for Canada, where Italy thrashed them in a one sided contest by scoring 48–7.

Career statistics

References 

1996 births
Living people
Canada international rugby union players
Canadian expatriate sportspeople in England
Canadian rugby union players
Rugby ATL players
Rugby union locks
Sportspeople from Ottawa
New England Free Jacks players